The ALCO RS-11 is a class of diesel-electric locomotive rated at , that rode on two-axle trucks, having a B-B wheel arrangement. This model was built by both Alco (327 units) and Montreal Locomotive Works (99 units). Total production was 426 units.

Development
The first three RS-11s were produced by ALCO in February 1956 as a demonstrator set. This locomotive, classified by ALCO as model DL-701, was their first high-horsepower road switcher, intended to be a replacement for the very popular RS-3 road switcher. Featuring a V-12,  251B diesel engine, the RS-11 was ALCO's answer to EMD's very successful GP9. The turbocharged RS-11 accelerated faster, had a higher tractive effort rating and typically used less fuel than the competition. It was also quite versatile and could be found in heavy haul freight as well as passenger service. It was produced in high-nose and low-nose versions. Montreal Locomotive Works also built 351 nearly identical units, known as the RS-18, for the Canadian market.

While the RS-11 benefited from the increased power and reliability offered with ALCO's new 251B engine, and was arguably a more advanced product than the GP9, its market acceptance was disappointing against the reputation EMD's locomotives had made for superior reliability.

Original purchasers

Preservation 

 Duluth, Winnipeg and Pacific 3612 is preserved as York-Durham Heritage Railway 3612 at the York–Durham Heritage Railway in Ontario
 Ferrocarriles Nacionales de México 7282 is preserved at the Yucatan RR Museum in Mérida, Yucatán.
 New York, New Haven and Hartford 1402 is preserved at the Danbury Railway Museum in Danbury, Connecticut
 Toledo, Peoria and Western 400 is preserved at the Illinois Railway Museum in Union, Illinois

See also 
 List of ALCO diesel locomotives
 List of MLW diesel locomotives

References

 
 Roster from The Diesel Shop http://www.thedieselshop.us/Alco_RS11.HTML 
 Waller, R. (1998). Locomotive Roster: 1976. Conrail Cyclopedia . Retrieved November 22, 2022, from http://crcyc.railfan.net/locos/misc/rosters/roster-76.html 

Diesel-electric locomotives of the United States
B-B locomotives
RS-11
RS-11
Railway locomotives introduced in 1956
Standard gauge locomotives of Mexico
Standard gauge locomotives of the United States
Standard gauge locomotives of Peru
Diesel-electric locomotives of Mexico
Diesel-electric locomotives of Peru